Eemmeerdijk Wind Park is a wind park consisting of 16 turbines situated at Zeewolde, Netherlands.
It is one of the few wind parks using wind turbines with just two blades. It was built in 1998 and used
19 wind turbines manufactured by NedWind with a 60-metre tall tower and a 55-metre large rotor. However, turbines 6 and 9 have been decommissioned and dismantled after a nick was found in the pylon of turbine 6 in 2006. And after lightning hit a blade from turbine 9, Turbine 9 was still there somewhere after 2009 seeing as google maps still shows the turbine https://www.google.com/maps/@52.2853861,5.3495734,3a,90y,73.9h,107.24t/data=!3m7!1e1!3m5!1sOgvwaZcb7TzoY1Og2vLagw!2e0!5s20090701T000000!7i13312!8i6656 . Turbine 7 has fallen down on January 4, 2023, due to the heavy winds.

Locations 

 Turbine 1: 
 Turbine 2: 
 Turbine 3: 
 Turbine 4: 
 Turbine 5: 
 Turbine 6:  has been decommissioned
 Turbine 7:  has been decommissioned / has fallen down
 Turbine 8: 
 Turbine 9:  has been decommissioned
 Turbine 10: 
 Turbine 11: 
 Turbine 12: 
 Turbine 13: 
 Turbine 14: 
 Turbine 15: 
 Turbine 16: 
 Turbine 17: 
 Turbine 18: 
 Turbine 19:

See also 

 Wind power in the Netherlands
 Renewable energy in the Netherlands

References

External links 
 http://skyscraperpage.com/diagrams/?buildingID=63136
 Wind turbine 9: http://www.nwvfoto.nl/gallery3/index.php/hulpdiensten/album236
 Wind turbine 6: http://www.nwvfoto.nl/gallery3/index.php/hulpdiensten/album119/06hv06_7271

1998 establishments in the Netherlands
Wind farms in the Netherlands
Buildings and structures in Flevoland
Zeewolde
Energy infrastructure completed in 1998
20th-century architecture in the Netherlands